So Electric: When It Was Now (The Remixes) is a remix album by Australian alternative rock band Atlas Genius. It was released as a 12" vinyl exclusively available at record stores on 29 November 2013. The vinyl is limited to 3,000 copies and includes a digital download card. The album was scheduled to be released digitally on 24 December 2013; it was ultimately released one week earlier on 17 December. This album contains remixes of songs from Atlas Genius' debut studio album, When It Was Now.

Track listing

Notes
"Centred On You" (Viceroy Remix) and "Symptoms" (Wild Cub Remix) are not included on the vinyl release.

Release history

References

2013 remix albums
Atlas Genius remix albums
Warner Records remix albums